Isam al-Qadi (died in 2006) was a Palestinian Ba'thist politician aligned with the Syrian government. He has been head of the Syrian-controlled as-Sa'iqa faction of the Palestine Liberation Organization (PLO) between 1979 and until his death in 2006. He lived and was buried in Damascus.

References

2006 deaths
20th-century births
Year of birth missing
Ba'ath Party politicians
Palestine Liberation Organization members